Raja Saleem Akhtar (Punjabi,)                                                                                                   (8 September 1930 – 22 April 2004) was a Pakistani cricketer who played for Multan and Sargodha. His sons Wasim Raja and Rameez Raja played for the Pakistan cricket team, while Zaeem Raja played first-class cricket.

He worked as a civil servant.

References

External links
 

1930 births
Pakistani cricketers
People from Gujranwala
Multan cricketers
Sargodha cricketers
2004 deaths
Pakistani civil servants